Paris Johnson Jr. (born July 3, 2001) is an American football offensive tackle for the Ohio State Buckeyes. He was included on the 2022 College Football All-America Team as a junior.

Early life and high school career
Johnson was born on July 3, 2001, in Cincinnati, Ohio. He later spent three years at St. Xavier High School before transferring to Princeton High School as a senior in 2019, where he won the Anthony Muñoz Award. A consensus five-star prospect and the top ranked offensive tackle of the class of 2020, he chose to attend Ohio State University.

College career
Johnson played in five games as a freshman in 2020, including at offensive guard due to an injury in the 2021 College Football Playoff National Championship, and started every game at right guard the following season. He moved to left tackle as a junior in 2022, where he was named a consensus All-American.

Personal life
Johnson majored in journalism at Ohio State, writing several articles for their student newspaper The Lantern before graduating in December 2022. He founded a charity foundation under his name in high school. It was awarded the 2022 Armed Forces Merit Award for their work in raising over $10,000 to assist military veterans, student-athletes, and the homeless. Johnson speaks Mandarin Chinese and some Portuguese, having studied the former since late childhood and the latter after gaining an interest in visiting Brazil.

References

External links 
 
 Paris Johnson Jr. Foundation
 Ohio State Buckeyes bio

2001 births
Living people
African-American players of American football
All-American college football players
American football offensive tackles
American football offensive guards
Players of American football from Cincinnati
Ohio State Buckeyes football players
People from Cincinnati
St. Xavier High School (Ohio) people